The 2010 Kenyan Super Cup was the second edition of the tournament, a Kenyan football match that was contested by 2009 Kenyan Premier League winners Sofapaka and 8-time FKl Cup champions A.F.C. Leopards.

Sofapaka defeated A.F.C. Leopards 1-0 for their first Super Cup title.

Match details

See also
2009 Kenyan Super Cup
2011 Kenyan Super Cup
Kenyan Premier League
FKF Cup

External links

Super Cup
2010